Laurence Gant MBE (21 July 1922 – 19 October 2004) was an English professional rugby league footballer who played as a  forward in the 1940s and 1950s, coached in the 1960s and 1970s, and refereed in the 1950s and 1960s. 

He played at club level for Wakefield Trinity (A-Team), and Featherstone Rovers (Heritage № 287), during the era of contested scrums, and coached at club level for Stanley Rangers ARLFC, Featherstone Rovers and York. Laurie Gant was the president of St Michael's Cricket club , and the Wakefield branch of the Royal British Legion.

Background
Laurie Gant was born in Wakefield, West Riding of Yorkshire, England, he worked as a cobbler in Wrenthorpe, in the 1981 New Year Honours, Gant was appointed a Member of the Order of the British Empire (MBE) for his services to rugby league, and he died aged 82 in Wakefield, West Yorkshire, England.

Playing career

Challenge Cup Final appearances
Laurie Gant played left-, i.e. number 11, in Featherstone Rovers' 12–18 defeat by Workington Town in the 1951–52 Challenge Cup Final during the 1951–52 season at Wembley Stadium, London on Saturday 19 April 1952, in front of a crowd of 72,093, he played despite having pneumonia, but following massage with brandy and rum.

Club career
Laurie Gant made his début for Featherstone Rovers on Monday 29 March 1948, he appears to have scored no drop-goals (or field-goals as they are currently known in Australasia), but prior to the 1974–75 season all goals, whether; conversions, penalties, or drop-goals, scored 2-points, consequently prior to this date drop-goals were often not explicitly documented, therefore '0' drop-goals may indicate drop-goals not recorded, rather than no drop-goals scored. In addition, prior to the 1949–50 season, the archaic field-goal was also still a valid means of scoring points.

Coaching career

Challenge Cup Final appearances
Laurie Gant was the coach in Featherstone Rovers' 17–12 victory over Barrow in the 1966–67 Challenge Cup Final during the 1966–67 season at Wembley Stadium, London on Saturday 13 May 1967, in front of a crowd of 76,290. This was the first Challenge Cup final attended by Elizabeth II and Prince Philip, Duke of Edinburgh.

County Cup Final appearances
Laurie Gant was the coach in Featherstone Rovers' 9–12 defeat by Hull F.C. in the 1969–70 Yorkshire County Cup Final during the 1969–70 season at Headingley Rugby Stadium, Leeds on Saturday 20 September 1969, and the 7–23 defeat by Leeds in the 1970–71 Yorkshire County Cup Final during the 1970–71 season at Odsal, Bradford on Saturday 21 November 1970.

References

External links

Search for "Gant" at rugbyleagueproject.org
Laurie Gant at marklaspalmas.blogspot.com
Stanley Rangers History

1922 births
2004 deaths
English rugby league coaches
English rugby league players
English rugby league referees
Featherstone Rovers coaches
Featherstone Rovers players
Members of the Order of the British Empire
Rugby league second-rows
Rugby league players from Wakefield
Wakefield Trinity players
York Wasps coaches